"Hotter than You Know" is a song by German girl group Preluders. It was written by Michale Graves and Celetia Martin and produced by Jörn-Uwe Fahrenkrog-Petersen and Gena Wernik. Released as a non-album single in May 2004, it reached number 21 on the German Singles Chart.

Formats and track listings

Credits and personnel

 Miriam Cani – vocals
 Anh-Thu Doan – vocals
 Jörn-Uwe Fahrenkrog-Petersen – production
 Nik Hafemann – supervising producer
 Jeo – mixing
 Kay Mason – editing

 Rebecca Miro – vocals
 Anne Ross – vocals
 Patricia Sadowski – vocals
 Jörg Sander – guitars
 Gena Wernik – production, mixing

Charts

References

2004 songs
Preluders songs
Polydor Records singles
Songs written by Celetia Martin